Martempering is also known as stepped quenching or interrupted quenching. In this process, steel is heated above the upper critical point (above the transformation range) and then quenched in a salt, oil, or lead bath kept at a temperature of 150-300 °C. The workpiece is held at this temperature above martensite start (Ms) point until the temperature becomes uniform throughout the cross-section of workpiece. After that it is cooled in air or oil to room temperature. The steel is then tempered. In this process, Austenite is transformed to martensite by step quenching, at a rate fast enough to avoid the formation of ferrite, pearlite or bainite.

In the martempering process, austenitized metal part is immersed in a bath at a temperature just above the martensite start temperature (Ms). By using interrupted quenching, the cooling is stopped at a point above the martensite transformation region to ensure sufficient time for the center to cool to the same temperature as the surface. The metal part is then removed from the bath and cooled in air to room temperature to permit the austenite to transform to martensite. Martempering is a method by which the stresses and strains generated during the quenching of a steel component can be controlled. In Martempering steel is heated to above the critical range to make it all austenite.

The drawback of this process is that the large section cannot be heat treated by this process.

See also
Tempering (metallurgy)
Austempering

References

External links
Heat Treating Terms and Definitions:engineers edge

Metal heat treatments